is a Japanese footballer. He is a forward.

He signed for Albirex Niigata (S) after graduating from Momoyama Gakuin University. His first season will be from 2017.

Club career statistics
As of Jan 2, 2017

References

External links

1995 births
Living people
Japanese footballers
Singapore Premier League players
Albirex Niigata Singapore FC players
Association football forwards